Mr. No Problem, is a 2016 Chinese black-and-white film directed by screenwriter Mei Feng in his directorial debut, based on a 1943 novella by Lao She. Starring Fan Wei, Yin Tao, Zhang Chao and Shi Yihong, Mr. No Problem was screened first at the 2016 Tokyo International Film Festival, and on 21 November 2017 in China.

Cast
Fan Wei as Ding Wuyuan (丁务源), the third and fifth director of Shuhua farm (树华农场)
Zhang Chao as Qin Miaozhai (秦妙斋)
Wang Hanbang as You Daxing (尤大兴), the fourth director of Shuhua farm
Yin Tao as Mingxia (明霞), wife of You Daxing
Jiang Zhongwei as Li Sanming (李三明), accountant of Shuhua farm

Awards and nominations

External links

Chinese black-and-white films
Films based on Chinese novels
Films set in the 1940s
Chinese drama films
2016 films
2016 directorial debut films